The Atlantic Greyhound Bus Terminal, at 109 Martin Luther King, Jr. Blvd. in Savannah, Georgia was listed on the National Register of Historic Places in 2016.

It was designed by architect George D. Brown in Streamline Moderne style. It was opened in 1938 and operated until 1965. It made intercity bus travel possible for residents of Savannah.

John Marisano bought the building and since 2018 it houses The Grey Bar & Restaurant.

References

National Register of Historic Places in Georgia (U.S. state)
Streamline Moderne architecture in Georgia (U.S. state)
Infrastructure completed in 1938
Chatham County, Georgia